The Excalibur automobile was a car styled after the 1928 Mercedes-Benz SSK by Brooks Stevens for Studebaker. Stevens subsequently formed a company to manufacture and market the cars, which were a standard Studebaker car with special bodywork (and soon got an upgraded engine as well).

A prototype premiered at car shows in 1963, fitted on a Studebaker Lark Convertable chassis and using a  Studebaker 289 V-8. Studebaker ceased engine production in December 1963 and consolidating all manufacturing to its Hamilton, Ontario plant, ending the availability of that engine.

Stevens subsequently obtained engines from General Motors through his friends GM executives Ed Cole and Semon "Bunkie" Knudsen. These were Chevrolet 327s in  Corvette tune, making the  Excalibur a strong performer. With the standard 3.31:1 rear axle, acceleration from  took less than six seconds.

Over 3,500 Excalibur cars were built, all in Milwaukee, Wisconsin. The American comedian Phyllis Diller was a notable proponent of the Excalibur automobile, and owned four of them.

The company failed in 1986 but was revived several times. Production of the Excalibur continued until 1990.

See also
 Clénet Coachworks
 Cumberford Martinique
 Sherwood Egbert
 Stutz Blackhawk
 Zimmer (automobile)

References

External links

 Site d'information sur l'automobile Excalibur (France)

Motor vehicle manufacturers based in Wisconsin
Retro-style automobiles